A triathlon is an endurance athletic event consisting of three stages, without a break: swimming, cycling and running, in that order.

Triathlon or Triathlete may also refer to:

Other three-part sports events
 Cross triathlon, swimming, mountain-biking, and trail-running 
 Winter triathlon, running, mountain biking, and cross-country skiing 
 Athletics at the 1904 Summer Olympics – Men's triathlon, long jump, shot put, and 100-yard dash
 Gymnastics at the 1904 Summer Olympics – Men's triathlon, horizontal bar, parallel bars, and horse
 Eventing, the equestrian triathlon

Other
 Triathlon, alias of Delroy Garrett, a fictional superhero character in Marvel Comics
 10346 Triathlon, a main-belt asteroid
 The Triathron, a sports game for the Famicom made by K. Amusemnet
 Triathlete, a magazine published by Outside (company)